Walter John Savitch (February 21, 1943 – February 1, 2021) was best known for defining the complexity class NL (nondeterministic logarithmic space), and for Savitch's theorem, which defines a relationship between the NSPACE and DSPACE complexity classes. His work in establishing complexity classes has helped to create the background against which non-deterministic and probabilistic reasoning can be performed. 

He also did extensive work in the field of natural language processing and mathematical linguistics. He was focused on computational complexity as it applies to genetics and biology for over 10 years.

Aside from his work in theoretical computer science, Savitch wrote a number of textbooks for learning to program in C/C++, Java, Ada, Pascal and others.

Savitch received his PhD in mathematics from University of California, Berkeley in 1969 under the supervision of Stephen Cook. Since then he was a professor at University of California, San Diego in the computer science department.

References

External links
Richard J. Lipton, Savitch’s Theorem. Gives a historical account on how Savitch's Theorem was discovered.

American computer scientists
University of California, Berkeley alumni
University of California, San Diego faculty
1943 births
2021 deaths
Computational linguistics researchers